Cheryl Phillips (born 23 February 1962) is a South African politician from the North West who has served in the National Assembly since May 2019. A member of the Democratic Alliance, she has been the Shadow Deputy Minister of Environment, Forestry and Fisheries since December 2020. She was the Shadow Deputy Minister of Mineral Resources and Energy from June 2019 to December 2020. Phillips had previously served as a ward councillor in Rustenburg.

Political career
Phillips campaigned for the "Yes" vote in the 1992 referendum. She moved to Rustenburg in 2001 and joined the Democratic Party. She later joined the Democratic Alliance.

In 2014, she was appointed to her ward's committee. Phillips was elected as the ward councillor for ward 16 in a by-election in January 2016.

Parliamentary career
In 2019, she was elected to the National Assembly of South Africa on the regional list of the DA. On 5 June 2019, she was appointed as the party's Shadow Deputy Minister of Mineral Resources and Energy.

In December 2020, she was appointed Shadow Deputy Minister of Environment, Forestry and Fisheries in the new Shadow Cabinet led by John Steenhuisen.

Committee membership

Present membership
Portfolio Committee on Environment, Forestry and Fisheries

Past membership
Portfolio Committee on Mineral Resources and Energy

Personal life
Phillips is married and has children.

References

External links

Living people
1962 births
White South African people
Democratic Party (South Africa) politicians
Democratic Alliance (South Africa) politicians
Members of the National Assembly of South Africa
Women members of the National Assembly of South Africa